Leonardo Pettinari (born 19 April 1973 in Pontedera) is an Italian rower.

References

 
 

1973 births
Living people
Italian male rowers
People from Pontedera
Rowers at the 1996 Summer Olympics
Rowers at the 2000 Summer Olympics
Rowers at the 2004 Summer Olympics
Olympic silver medalists for Italy
Olympic rowers of Italy
Olympic medalists in rowing
World Rowing Championships medalists for Italy
Medalists at the 2000 Summer Olympics
Mediterranean Games bronze medalists for Italy
Mediterranean Games medalists in rowing
Competitors at the 2005 Mediterranean Games
Sportspeople from the Province of Pisa